The 2012 Manipur Legislative Assembly election was held in Indian state of Manipur in Feb-March 2012, to elect 60 members to the Manipur Legislative Assembly.

Results
The Voter turnout was 79.19%. Congress won majority of the seats. Incumbent Chief Minister Okram Ibobi Singh was re-elected for the post.

In 2014, the Manipur State Congress Party (MSCP) merged with the Indian National Congress which raised the number of INC MLAs to 47.

Results by constituency
The list of winners and runners-up in each constituency are given below:

See also 
 List of constituencies of the Manipur Legislative Assembly
 2012 elections in India

References

2012 State Assembly elections in India
2012
2012
February 2012 events in India
March 2012 events in India